De De Pyaar De is a 2019 Indian romantic comedy film written by Luv Ranjan and directed by Akiv Ali in his directorial debut. It was produced by Bhushan Kumar, Krishan Kumar, Luv Ranjan and Ankur Garg under their respective banners T-Series Films and Luv Films. It stars Ajay Devgn, Tabu and Rakul Preet Singh. The film follows Ashish, a middle-aged NRI and would-be divorcé; he decides to marry Ayesha, a young woman who is almost half his age. Chaos occurs when Ayesha is introduced to his family, including his soon to be ex-wife and children.

Pre-production for De De Pyaar De began in February 2017, with Devgn being the first cast member to join the crew. Principal photography commenced on 19 January 2018 in Mumbai. Following filming schedules in London and Kullu Manali Circuit, shooting concluded in August 2018. The film's soundtrack was composed by Amaal Mallik, Rochak Kohli, Tanishk Bagchi, Vipin Patwa and Manj Musik with lyrics written by Kumaar, Kunaal Vermaa, Garry Sandhu, Mellow D and Tanishk Bagchi, and released under the banner T-Series.

De De Pyaar De was scheduled to release on 15 March 2019, but was delayed to avoid competition with Devgn's Total Dhamaal, which was to release in that time period. It was theatrically released in India on 17 May 2019. The film received generally mixed reviews; while critics praised the performances of Devgn and Tabu, its misogynistic ideals attracted criticism.

Plot 
Ashish Mehra is a 50-year-old NRI businessman settled in London. He meets the 26 year-old Ayesha Khurana; they begin dating and a serious relationship, living together. Ashish informs her that he is separated from his wife Manjana "Manju" Rao who lives in India with their children. After a back and forth regarding their age gap, Ashish decides to introduce Ayesha to his family, he takes her to his home in Manali.

Manju and their children are now living with Ashish's parents. His daughter Ishika is irritated by his arrival, believing he will ruin the meeting with her boyfriend, Rishi and her to-be father-in-law Atul Saxena. Startled, Ashish creates a lie regarding how Ayesha is his secretary, much to Ayesha’s detest. Ayesha and Manju feel tension over their feelings for Ashish. Due to circumstances, Ashish is introduced as Manju's brother to Ishita's future in-laws.

Ayesha and Manju fail to get along well. After finally noticing that Ayesha and Ashish are together, Ishika shouts at Ashish for lying to his entire family. He finally reveals he brought Ayesha to gain the approval of his family; Atul also learns the same and calls off the wedding as he feels the family is not reliable. Manju defends Ashish and Ayesha’s relationship in front of their entire family, where Ashish consoles Manju.

The next day, Ayesha finds out that Manju and Ashish got intimate and Manju responds that she is still his wife and Ayesha is technically the other woman. Disheartened, Ayesha returns to London. Ashish convinces Atul for the marriage between Ishika and Rishi, and begins missing Ayesha when his daughter’s wedding arrangements go in full swing. Manju realizes the true longing the couple have for each other and goes to London to ask Ayesha to give Ashish a second chance, Thus, Ayesha reunites with him. In the mid-credits scene, the two argue on whether they should meet Ayesha's family.

Cast 
 Ajay Devgn as Ashish "Ashu" Mehra
 Tabu as Manjana "Manju" Rao
 Rakul Preet Singh as Ayesha Khurana
 Javed Jaffrey as Sameer Khanna
 Jimmy Shergill as Vakil "VK" Kapoor
 Alok Nath as Veerendra Mehra
 Madhumalti Kapoor as Suman Mehra
 Kumud Mishra as Atul Saxena
 Inayat Sood as Ishika Mehra
 Bhavin Bhanushali as Ishaan Mehra
 Rajveer Singh as Rishi Saxena
 Sunny Singh as Akash Singhania (cameo)
 Radhika Bangia (cameo)

Production

Development and casting 
In February 2017, Luv Ranjan confirmed that Ajay Devgn had committed to star in an untitled "urban comedy" film that would be written by Luv Ranjan and produced by Ranjan and Ankur Garg. The "contemporary rom-com" was to be directed by film editor Akiv Ali in his directorial debut, who had previously worked as editor on Ranjan's films, among others. Devgn played a 50-year-old in the film, the first time he played a character his real age; he attributed it to "meatier roles.. being written for actors of [his] age and audience accepts it". It was also his first romance film in years. Devgn mentioned that the film's premise followed "strong woman characters[,] and there's also a nice message".

In May 2017, a member of the film's crew confirmed that Tabu was confirmed to play one of the film's female leads opposite Devgn, marking her seventh collaboration with the actor; their last production together at the time was Golmaal Again (2017). According to Tabu, the film highlights the differences in "[t]he way a mid-40s couple deals with their relationship, their definition of love and relationship will be different than a 27-year-old woman. Her insecurities are different and issues are varied". Jimmy Sheirgill's inclusion in the cast in a supporting role as the love interest of Tabu's character, was confirmed in late April 2018. Sheirgill had previously shared screen space with Tabu for the 1996 film Maachis, which was also his film debut.

After the success of their previous comedy Sonu Ke Titu Ki Sweety (2018), Luv Films and Bhushan Kumar of T-Series formed a mutual understanding to continue their collaboration by co-producing a series of films, the first of which was De De Pyaar De. In mid-January 2018, Rakul Preet Singh, who had earlier made her debut with the T-Series production Yaariyan, was signed in as a female lead opposite Devgn. According to Ranjan, Singh's "natural persona fit[ted] the character to the tee". In February 2018, Singh confirmed her casting and said she had "a meaty role", but couldn't reveal more details at the time.

Principal photography 
Principal photography commenced on 19 January 2018 at Mumbai. The film had a production budget of 780 million. In June 2018, Singh revealed that close to 50 percent of filming was completed at that point. The next shooting schedule of the film commenced in July 2018 at London. In August 2018, Devgn and Singh began their next schedule in Kullu Manali Circuit. By August 2018, filming was completed and post-production work commenced.

Music 

The film's soundtrack was composed by Amaal Mallik, Rochak Kohli, Tanishk Bagchi, Vipin Patwa and Manj Musik, with lyrics written by Kumaar, Kunaal Vermaa, Garry Sandhu, Mellow D and Tanishk Bagchi. It was released by T-Series on 15 May 2019.

Tanishk Bagchi recreated Garry Sandhu's single Yeah Baby as Hauli Hauli with additional voice of Neha Kakkar and rap by Mellow D.

Manj Musik recreated Surjit Bindarikhia's track Mukhda Vekh Ke in the voice of Mika Singh and Dhvani Bhanushali.

Shreya Paul of Firstpost wrote that the music is "as problematic as the plot seems to be", noting that it "doesn't do much to evoke any worthy reaction from listeners, except for maybe a sigh of disappointment". Paul, however, praised "Dil Royi Jaye" for "stand[ing] apart" from the rest of the songs.

Marketing 

The film's first look poster, which depicted Devgn perched atop two cars with the leading ladies, was released on 22 March 2019. The official trailer was released on 2 April 2019, on the occasion of Devgn's 50th birthday. A writer for Hindustan Times wrote of the trailer, "Ajay Devgn's birthday gift to his fans is a laugh riot". Similarly, Pranita Chaubey of NDTV commented that it "will tickle your funny bone". The song "Vaddi Sharaban" was released on 11 April 2019.
 Next, another song, "Tu Mila To Haina" was released on 22 April 2019.
 "Hauli Hauli", which was released on 26 April 2019, was a remix of the original by Hauli Hauli by Garry Sandhu. Sandhu re-sung the song with additional vocals from Neha Kakkar.
 The song "Chale Aana" was released on 2 May 2019.

Release 
De De Pyaar De was first scheduled to release on 14 January 2019; after the release of Avengers: Endgame (2019) in India was also revealed to be on the same day, the release was preponed to 15 March 2019. Later on, to avoid competition from Total Dhamaal, another film starring Devgn which was to release on 22 February 2019, the film was indefinitely postponed, and the release was later revealed to be on 17 May 2019. The British Board of Film Classification (BBFC) certified the film with a runtime of 135 minutes. It opened for paid previews on 16 May, one day prior to its theatrical release.

Reception

Box office 
On its first day of release in India, the film earned 8.5 crore nett, which was lower than trade expectations. On the second day, however, collections rose by 50 percent to 12.5 crore nett, owing to positive word-of-mouth. The film earned 14 crore nett on the third day. On its first Monday, it maintained a strong hold with earnings of 5.85 crore nett. It dropped slightly on Tuesday to earn 5.5 crore nett. The earnings on Wednesday were 5.15 crore nett. On Friday, the film collected 3.25 crore nett. It showed growth of 45 percent on Saturday to earn 4.5 crore nett. On its second Monday, the film earned 2.5 crore nett. Tuesday collections dropped slightly to 2.25 crore nett. It has grossed 319.98 crore worldwide, with gross of 123.38 crore in India and 19.66 crore from overseas.

Critical response 
De De Pyaar De was released to generally mixed reviews from critics. While some critics praised the chemistry between Devgn and Tabu, others alleged that the film promoted misogynist ideals. 

Taran Adarsh of Bollywood Hungama gave it four stars out of five and praised all aspects of production, concluding, "On the whole, De De Pyaar De is a paisa vasool entertainer with plenty of laugh aloud moments and strong emotions as its USP". Anita Iyer of Khaleej Times gave two stars out of five and felt that the "[l]ack of a storyline is hardly compensated by the presence of the stars on board". Manjusha Radhakrishnan of Gulf News gave three stars out of five: "[I]f you can ignore [the female leads'] questionable choice in men, there's a lot to enjoy in De De Pyaar De". Raja Sen of Hindustan Times gave two and a half stars out of five and felt that Devgn delivered his "sincerest performance", while Stutee Ghosh of The Quint gave three stars out of five and wrote that the film "owes a lot to Ajay Devgn and Tabu's chemistry".

Ronak Kotecha of The Times of India was impressed with the film for "reinstat[ing] the fact that when it comes to love, age is just a number", giving it three and a half stars out of five. Meena Iyer of Daily News and Analysis concurred, opining that it "nicely captures frailties in human relationships". Mayur Sanap of Deccan Chronicle disagreed, writing, "Despite its bright premise and superlative cast, the Akiv Ali directorial isn't as smart as it aspires to be", and rated it two and a half stars out of five. Similarly, Mayank Shekhar of Mid-Day gave the film one and a half stars out of five and lamented, "It's almost like the filmmakers are certain the intended audience won't connect much with such a young-old love, by itself, in a single screen theatre". Gaurang Chauhan of Times Now rated it three stars out of five and attributed the film's strength to strong performances. Shubhra Gupta of The Indian Express gave two and a half stars out of five and felt the film was "a mixed bag", stating, "You wish the film had been braver in its intention of creating a really cracking rom-com, instead of playing its clichés for a laugh".

Anna M. M. Vetticad of Firstpost gave one star out of five and opined it was "a vehicle for claims of universal male victimhood, better disguised than its co-producer and co-writer Luv Ranjan's three directorial ventures that have struck box office gold in the past decade". Nandini Ramnath of Scroll.in felt the film's "biggest achievement is that it might actually compel filmmakers to ask whether their leads are appropriately matched wrinkle for wrinkle rather than forcing chronological acrobatics on viewers". Kunal Guha of Mumbai Mirror wrote, "The build-up gets dangerously close to that tipping point from where on expects it to nose-dive, but it doesn't". Charu Thakur of India Today praised Tabu's performance as "light[ing] up every frame with her presence, and [a] comic timing.. par excellence. Reshu Manglik of India TV gave one star out of five and called it "[a] shapeless tale of unusual love story that takes you nowhere".

References

External links
 
 
 

2010s Hindi-language films
2019 films
Films shot in London
Films shot in England
Indian romantic comedy films
Films distributed by Yash Raj Films
T-Series (company) films
2019 romantic comedy films